Ras Mesfin Sileshi (Amharic: መስፍን ስለሺ; 5 July 1905 – 23 November 1974) was an Ethiopian Major General and politician.

Biography
He was born in 1905, in Lafto kebele in Webera province in Hararghe. His father was Dejazmach Sileshi Woldesemayat and his mother was Woyzero Askale Garedew. His brother was Dejazmach Bezabeh Sileshi. At the outbreak of the Italian invasion in 1935, he was a major in the Ethiopian Army. During the occupation, he joined the resistance and became one of its leaders in Shewa.

After liberation, he was appointed Governor-General of Illubabor from 1942 to 1946 and then of Kaffa from 1946 to 1955. During his tenure in Kaffa he encouraged aristocrats and the merchants to adopt modern coffee planting methods, and he had a special interest in coffee planting himself.

He was briefly Mayor of Addis Ababa in 1947. In 1955 he joined the cabinet as Minister of Interior, serving until 1957, when he was appointed Vice-Governor-General of Shewa.

Ras Mesfin was enormously wealthy and widely considered the largest individual landowner in Ethiopia, and his estates were claimed to reach up to 50,000 gashas (2,000,000 ha) in Illubabor and Kaffa alone, in addition to large estates in Shewa and Hararghe. These claims, however, should viewed with skepticism as they are primarily sourced from hostile sources disseminated following the 1974 coup.

He was head of the Patriots' Association, the national association of veterans of the resistance and a fiercely pro-monarchy group. He was arrested by the Derg in August 1974 during the "creeping coup" and was among those summarily executed in the Massacre of the Sixty.

References 

20th-century Ethiopian politicians
Mayors of Addis Ababa
Assassinated Ethiopian politicians
1905 births
1974 deaths